Andy Tudor is a video game designer. He is the Creative Director for the video game developer Slightly Mad Studios in London, England.

Career
Tudor is known for working on Need for Speed: Shift (2009), Shift 2: Unleashed (2011), and The Walking Dead: Assault (2013). He is also credited as a Voice Director and Motion Capture Technical Director on previous titles for SCE Cambridge Studio, including 24: The Game. and Primal.

Credits

Video games
 The Walking Dead: Assault (2013), Skybound
 Shift 2: Unleashed  (2011), Electronic Arts
 Need for Speed: Shift  (2009), Electronic Arts
 24: The Game  (2006), Sony Computer Entertainment, Inc.
 Primal  (2003), Sony Computer Entertainment, Inc.

References

External links 

Living people
British video game designers
British voice directors
Video game designers
People from Douglas, Isle of Man
Year of birth missing (living people)